Henry Adair Pickard (12 May 1832 – 28 September 1905) was an English first-class cricketer and clergyman.
 
The son of Henry William Adair, he was born Worksop in May 1832. He was educated at Rugby School, before going up to Christ Church, Oxford. He made two appearances in first-class cricket while a student at Oxford, but did not appear for Oxford University. His first appearance came in 1852 for Sheffield against Manchester at Manchester, with his second appearance coming the following season for the Gentlemen of England against the Gentlemen of Marylebone Cricket Club at Lord's. After graduating from Oxford in 1855, he became an Anglican clergyman. He later served as an inspector of schools in 1864. Pickard died at his home along the Banbury Road in Oxford in September 1905.

References

External links

1832 births
1905 deaths
Sportspeople from Worksop
Cricketers from Nottinghamshire
People educated at Rugby School
Alumni of Christ Church, Oxford
English cricketers
Sheffield Cricket Club cricketers
Gentlemen of England cricketers
19th-century English Anglican priests
20th-century English Anglican priests